Aubrey Drake Graham is a Canadian rapper, singer, and actor. He began an acting career in 2001 under his legal name. During his acting career, he won five Young Artist Award nominations for portraying Jimmy Brooks in the CTV teen drama Degrassi: The Next Generation, alongside an Best Ensemble in a TV Series (Comedy or Drama) win at the 2002 Young Artist Awards. He began a music career in 2006, for which he has won subsequent honours.

Overall, Drake has won 193 awards, including 5 Grammy Awards from 51 nominations. He has won a record 29 awards from 81 nominations at the Billboard Music Awards, including Artist of the Decade.

American Music Awards
Created by Dick Clark in 1973, the American Music Awards is an annual music awards ceremony and one of several major annual American music awards shows. Drake has received thirty-four nominations.

|-
|rowspan="2"|2010
|Drake
|Favorite Rap/Hip-Hop Artist
| 
|-
|Thank Me Later
|rowspan="2"|Favorite Rap/Hip-Hop Album
| 
|-
| rowspan="3"|2012
|Take Care
| 
|-
|rowspan="3"|Drake
|Artist of the Year
| 
|-
|rowspan="2"|Favorite Rap/Hip-Hop Artist
| 
|-
|rowspan="2"|2014
| 
|-
|Nothing Was the Same
|rowspan="2"| Favorite Rap/Hip-Hop Album
| 
|-
|rowspan="2"|2015
|If You're Reading This It's Too Late
| 
|-
|rowspan="3"|Drake
|rowspan="2"|Favorite Rap/Hip-Hop Artist
| 
|-
|rowspan="12"|2016
| 
|-
|Favorite Pop/Rock Male Artist
| 
|-
|rowspan="2"|Views
|Favorite Pop/Rock Album
| 
|-
|rowspan="2"|Favorite Rap/Hip-Hop Album
| 
|-
|What a Time to Be Alive 
| 
|-
|rowspan="3"|"One Dance" 
|Favorite Pop/Rock Song
| 
|-
|Favorite Soul/R&B Song
| 
|-
|rowspan="2"|Collaboration of the Year
| 
|-
|rowspan="3"|"Work" 
| 
|-
|Favorite Soul/R&B Song
| 
|-
|Video of the Year
| 
|-
|"Hotline Bling"
|Favorite Rap/Hip-Hop Song
| 
|-
|rowspan="5"|2017
|rowspan="3"|Drake
|Artist of the Year
| 
|-
|Favorite Pop/Rock Male Artist
| 
|-
|Favorite Rap/Hip-Hop Artist
| 
|-
|rowspan="2"|More Life
|Favorite Pop/Rock Album
| 
|-
|Favorite Rap/Hip-Hop Album
| 
|-
|rowspan="8"|2018
|rowspan="3"|Drake
|Artist of the Year
| 
|-
|Favorite Pop/Rock Male Artist
| 
|-
|Favorite Rap/Hip-Hop Artist
| 
|-
|rowspan="2"|Scorpion
|Favorite Pop/Rock Album
| 
|-
|Favorite Rap/Hip-Hop Album
| 
|-
|rowspan="3"|"God's Plan"
|Video of the Year
| 
|-
|Favorite Pop/Rock Song
| 
|-
|Favorite Rap/Hip-Hop Song
| 
|-
|rowspan="3"|2019
|rowspan="3"|Drake
|Artist of the Year
|
|-
|Favorite Pop/Rock Male Artist
|
|-
|Favorite Rap/Hip-Hop Artist
|
|-
|rowspan="2"|2020
|"Life Is Good" (featuring Future)
|Favorite Music Video
|
|-
|"No Guidance" (featuring Chris Brown)
|Favorite Song – Soul/R&B
|
|-
|rowspan="4"|2021
|rowspan="3"|Drake
|Artist of the Year
|
|-
|Favorite Pop/Rock Male Artist
|
|-
|Favorite Rap/Hip-Hop Male Artist
|
|-
|Certified Lover Boy
|Favorite Album – Hip-Hop
|
|-

ARIA Music Awards
The Australian Recording Industry Association Music Awards are awarded annually by the Australian Recording Industry Association (ARIA).

!
|-
|2016
|Himself
|Best International Artist
| 
|style="text-align:center;"| 
|-
|2018
|Himself
|Best International Artist
|

All Africa Music Awards 
The All Africa Music Awards is an award presented by International Committee of AFRIMA and African Union.

!
|-
|2021
|Himself 
|Best Global Act
|
|

BAFTA TV Awards
The BAFTA TV Awards, or British Academy Television Awards, are presented in an annual award show hosted by the British Academy of Film and Television Arts (BAFTA). Drake has received one nomination as the executive producer of the television series Euphoria.

!
|-
! scope="row"| 2020
| Euphoria 
| Best International Programme
| 
|align="center"| 
|}

BBC Music Awards
The BBC Music Awards are the BBC's inaugural pop music awards, first held in December 2014, as a celebration of the musical achievements over the past 12 months.

!
|-
! scope="row"| 2016
| "One Dance" 
| BBC Song of the Year
| 
|}

BET Awards
The BET Awards were established in 2001 by the Black Entertainment Television (BET) network to celebrate African Americans and other minorities in music, acting, sports and other fields of entertainment. The awards are presented annually and broadcast live on BET. Drake has won thirteen awards from fifty one nominations.

|-
|rowspan="7"|2010
|-
|Himself
|Best Male Hip-Hop Artist
| 
|-
|"Successful"
|rowspan="2"|Best Collaboration
| 
|-
|"Forever"
| 
|-
|"BedRock"
|Viewer's Choice
| 
|-
|rowspan=2|Young Money
|Best Group
| 
|-
|Best New Artist
| 
|-
|rowspan="4"|2011
|Himself
|Best Male Hip Hop Artist
| 
|-
|rowspan="2"|"What's My Name?"
|Best Collaboration
| 
|-
|rowspan="2"|Coca-Cola Viewer's Choice
| 
|-
|"Moment 4 Life"
| 
|-
|rowspan="6"|2012
|-
|"I'm on One"
|rowspan="2"|Best Collaboration
| 
|-
|rowspan="2"|"The Motto"
| 
|-
|Coca-Cola Viewer's Choice
| 
|-
|rowspan="2"|Himself
|FANdemonium Award
| 
|-
|Best Male Hip-Hop Artist
| 
|-
|rowspan="12"|2013
|rowspan="2"| "No Lie"
|Best Collaboration
| 
|-
|rowspan="2"|Video of the Year
| 
|-
|rowspan="3"| "Problems"
| 
|-
|Best Collaboration
| 
|-
|Coca-Cola Viewer's Choice
| 
|-
|rowspan="2"| "Poetic Justice"
|Best Collaboration
| 
|-
|rowspan="2"|Video of the Year
| 
|-
|rowspan="2"| "Started from the Bottom"
| 
|-
|Coca-Cola Viewer's Choice
| 
|-
|"Pop That"
|Best Collaboration
| 
|-
|"HYFR"
|Video of the Year
| 
|-
|Himself
|Best Male Hip-Hop Artist
| 
|-
|rowspan="5"|2014
|"Hold On, We're Going Home"
|Best Collaboration
| 
|-
|rowspan="2"| "Worst Behavior"
|Video of the Year
| 
|-
|Coca-Cola Viewer's Choice
| 
|-
|Young Money
|Best Group
| 
|-
|Himself
|Best Male Hip Hop Artist
| 
|-
|rowspan="4"|2015
|"Only"
|Coca-Cola Viewer's Choice
| 
|-
|Young Money
|Best Group
| 
|-
|rowspan="2"|Himself
|Best Male Hip Hop Artist
| 
|-
|FANdemoniam Award
| 
|-
|rowspan="9"|2016
|rowspan="2"| "Where Ya At"
|Best Collaboration
| 
|-
|rowspan="2"|Coca-Cola Viewer's Choice
| 
|-
|rowspan="3"| "Work"
| 
|-
|Best Collaboration
| 
|-
|rowspan="2"|Video of the Year
| 
|-
|rowspan="2"| "Hotline Bling"
| 
|-
|Coca-Cola Viewer's Choice
| 
|-
|Himself and Future
|Best Group
| 
|-
|rowspan=2|Himself
|rowspan=2|Best Male Hip Hop Artist
| 
|-
|rowspan=2|2017
| 
|-
|"Fake Love"
|Viewers’ Choice Award
| 
|-
|rowspan="4"|2018
|Himself
|Best Male Hip Hop Artist
| 
|-
|rowspan="2"|"God's Plan"
|Viewers’ Choice Award
| 
|-
|rowspan="2"|Video of the Year
| 
|-
|"Walk It Talk It"
|
|-
|rowspan="5"|2019
|Himself
|Best Male Hip Hop Artist
| 
|-
|rowspan="2"|"Sicko Mode"
|Viewers’ Choice Award
| 
|-
|Best Collaboration
| 
|-
|"In My Feelings"
||Viewers’ Choice Award
| 
|-
|"Nice For What"
|Video of the Year
| 
|-
|rowspan="6"|2020
|Himself
|Best Male Hip Hop Artist
| 
|-
|rowspan="3"|"No Guidance" (featuring Chris Brown)
|Video of the Year
| 
|-
|Best Collaboration
| 
|-
|rowspan="2"|Coca-Cola Viewers' Choice Award
| 
|-
|rowspan="2"|"Life Is Good" (featuring Future)
| 
|-
|rowspan="2"|Best Collaboration
| 
|-
|rowspan="5"|2021
|rowspan="2"|"Popstar" (featuring DJ Khaled) (Starring Justin Bieber)
| 
|-
|rowspan="2"|Coca-Cola Viewers' Choice Award
| 
|-
|rowspan="2"| "Laugh Now Cry Later"
| 
|-
|Video of the Year
| 
|-
|Himself
|Best Male Hip Hop Artist
|

BET Hip Hop Awards
The BET Hip Hop Awards are hosted annually by BET for hip hop performers, producers and music video directors. Drake has won twenty awards from eighty-three nominations.

|-
|rowspan="4"|2009
|rowspan="4"|Himself
|Lyricist of the Year
| 
|-
|Rookie of the Year
| 
|-
|MVP of the Year
| 
|-
|Hustler of the Year
| 
|-
|rowspan="8"|2010
|"Over"
|People's Champ Award
| 
|-
|"Forever"
|Perfect Combo Award
| 
|-
|"Find Your Love"
|Best Hip Hop Video
| 
|-
|Thank Me Later
|CD Of The Year
| 
|-
|rowspan="4"|Himself
|Best Live Performer
| 
|-
|Hustler Of The Year
| 
|-
|Lyricist Of The Year
| 
|-
|MVP Of The Year
| 
|-
|rowspan="3"| 2011
|rowspan="3"|"I'm on One"
|Best Collaboration
| 
|-
|Best Hip-Hop Video
| 
|-
|Best Club Banger
| 
|-
|rowspan="10"| 2012
|-
|HYFR
|Best Hip-Hop Video
| 
|-
|rowspan="2"|"The Motto"
|Reese's Perfect Combo Award
| 
|-
|Best Club Banger
| 
|-
|"Stay Schemin'"
|Sweetest Sixteen (Best Featured Verse)
| 
|-
|rowspan="3"|"No Lie"
|People's Champ Award
| 
|-
|Best Hip-Hop Video
| 
|-
|Reese's Perfect Combo Award
| 
|-
|Take Care
|CD Of The Year
| 
|-
|Himself
|Best Live Performer
| 
|-
|rowspan="13"| 2013
|rowspan="2"|"Started From the Bottom"
|People's Champ Award
| 
|-
|rowspan="2"|Best Hip Hop Video
| 
|-
|rowspan="2"|"Fuckin' Problems"
| 
|-
|rowspan="2"|Best Collabo, Duo or Group
| 
|-
|rowspan="2"|"Pop That"
| 
|-
|rowspan="3"|Best Club Banger
| 
|-
|"Started From the Bottom"
| 
|-
|rowspan="2"|"Fuckin' Problems"
| 
|-
|People's Champ Award
| 
|-
|"Versace (Remix)"
|Sweet 16 (Best Featured Verse)
| 
|-
|"Poetic Justice"
|Best Collabo, Duo or Group
| 
|-
|rowspan="2"|Himself
|Lyricist of the Year
| 
|-
|MVP of the Year
| 
|-
|rowspan="8"| 2014
|rowspan="2"| "Worst Behavior"
|Best Hip Hop Video
| 
|-
|People's Champ Award
| 
|-
|"Who Do You Love?"
|Sweet 16 (Best Featured Verse)
| 
|-
|Nothing Was the Same
|Album of the Year
| 
|-
|rowspan="4"|Himself
|Best Live Performer
| 
|-
|Lyricist of the Year
| 
|-
|MVP of the Year
| 
|-
|Hustler of the Year
| 
|-
|rowspan="12"|2015
|rowspan="4"|"Blessings"
|Peoples Champ Award
| 
|-
|Best Collab, Duo, or Group
| 
|-
|Best Hip-Hop Video
| 
|-
|rowspan="2"|Sweet 16 Award
| 
|-
|"My Way (Remix)"
| 
|-
|"Truffle Butter"
|Best Collab, Duo, or Group
| 
|-
|rowspan="5"|Himself
|Hustler of the Year
| 
|-
|Best Lyricist of the Year
| 
|-
|Best Live Performer
| 
|-
|MVP of the Year
| 
|-
|Best Hip-Hop Style
| 
|-
|If You're Reading This It's Too Late
|Album of the Year
| 
|-
|rowspan="12"|2016
|rowspan="2"|"For Free"
|Peoples Champ Award
| 
|-
|rowspan="3"|Best Collab, Duo, or Group
| 
|-
|"One Dance"
| 
|-
|"Jumpman" 
| 
|-
|"Hotline Bling"
|Best Hip-Hop Video
| 
|-
|"Work"
|Sweet 16 Award
| 
|-
|rowspan="5"|Himself
|Hustler of the Year
| 
|-
|Best Lyricist of the Year
| 
|-
|Best Live Performer
| 
|-
|MVP of the Year
| 
|-
|Best Hip-Hop Style
| 
|-
|Views
|Album of the Year
| 
|-
|rowspan="2"|2017
|rowspan="6"|Himself
|Hot Ticket Performer
| 
|-
|Lyricist of the Year
| 
|-
|rowspan="11"|2018
|Hot Ticket Performer
| 
|-
|Lyricist of the Year
| 
|-
|MVP of the Year
| 
|-
|Hustler of the Year
| 
|-
|"Nice for What"
|rowspan="2"|Single of the Year
| 
|-
|rowspan="2"|"God's Plan"
|
|-
|rowspan="2"|Best Hip Hop Video
| 
|-
|"Walk It Talk It" 
| 
|-
|rowspan="2"|"Look Alive" 
||Best Collabo, Duo or Group
| 
|-
||Sweet 16: Best Featured Verse
| 
|-
|Scorpion
||Album of the Year
| 
|-
|rowspan="6"|2020
|rowspan="3"|Himself
|Hip Hop Artist of the Year
| 
|-
|Best Live Performer
| 
|-
|Lyricist of the Year
| 
|-
|rowspan="2"|"Life Is Good" 
|rowspan="1"|Best Hip Hop Video
| 
|-
|Best Collaboration
| 
|-
| "Toosie Slide"
|Best Hip Hop Video
| 
|-
|rowspan="8"|2021
|rowspan="3"| Himself
|Hip Hop Artist of the Year
|
|-
|Lyricist of the Year
|
|-
|Hustler of the Year
|
|-
|rowspan="2"|"Laugh Now Cry Later" 
|Best Hip Hop Video
|
|-
|rowspan="2"|Best Collaboration
|
|-
|"Mr. Right Now" 
|
|-
|Future & Drake
|Best Duo/Group
|
|-
|"Having Our Way"
|Sweet 16: Best Featured Verse
|
|}

Billboard Music Awards
The Billboard Music Award had been discontinued since 2007, but returned in 2011. Drake has won thirty four awards. He was presented with the Billboard Artist of the Decade award for the 2010s, with the other finalists being Taylor Swift, Bruno Mars, Rihanna and Adele.

Billboard Latin Music Awards

BMI Awards
The BMI Awards are held annually by Broadcast Music, Inc. to award songwriters in various genres, including Hip-Hop/R&B,  country and pop.

BMI R&B/Hip-Hop Awards 

!
|-
| rowspan="4"| 2010
| Best I Ever Had
| rowspan="4" | Most-Performed Urban Songs Of The Year
| 
| style="text-align:center;" rowspan="4"|
|-
| Every Girl
| 
|-
| Forever
| 
|-
| Successful
| 
|-
| rowspan="8"| 2011
| Himself
| Urban Songwriter of the Year
| 
| style="text-align:center;" rowspan="8"|
|-
| Bedrock
| rowspan="7"| Urban Winning Songs
| 
|-
| Find Your Love
| 
|-
| I Invented Sex (with Trey Songz)
| 
|-
| Money to Blow (with Birdman)
| 
|-
| Over
| 
|-
| Say Something (with Timbaland)
| 
|-
| Un-Thinkable (I'm Ready) (with Alicia Keys)
| 
|-
| rowspan="14"| 2012
| Himself
| Urban Songwriters of the Year
| 
| style="text-align:center;" rowspan="14"|
|-
| Aston Martin Music (with Rick Ross)
| rowspan="7"| Urban Winning Songs
| 
|-
| Headlines
| 
|-
| I'm On One (with DJ Khaled)
| 
|-
| Moment 4 Life (with Nicki Minaj)
| 
|-
| Right Above It (with Lil Wayne)
| 
|-
| She Will (with Lil Wayne)
| 
|-
| What's My Name(with Rihanna)
| 
|-
| Make Me Proud
| rowspan="3"| Hot R&B/Hip-Hop Airplay & Hot R&B/Hip-Hop Songs
| 
|-
| The Motto
| 
|-
| She Will (with Lil Wayne)
| 
|-
| Headlines
| rowspan="3"| Hot Rap Songs
| 
|-
| Make Me Proud
| 
|-
| The Motto
| 
|-
| rowspan="9"| 2013
| Make Me Proud
| rowspan="4" | Most-Performed Songs
| 
| style="text-align:center;" rowspan="9"|
|-
| No Lie
| 
|-
| Take Care
| 
|-
| The Motto
| 
|-
|"Fuckin' Problems" (with A$AP Rocky)
| rowspan="3"| Billboard No. 1s Hot R&B/Hip-Hop Airplay 
| 
|-
| No Lie
| 
|-
| "Started From the Bottom"
| 
|-
| No Lie
| Billboard No. 1s Hot R&B/Hip-Hop Songs
| 
|-
| No Lie
| Billboard No. 1s Hot Rap Songs
| 
|-
| rowspan="5"| 2014
|"Fuckin' Problems"
| rowspan="5" | 35 Most Performed R&B/Hip-Hop Songs
| 
| style="text-align:center;" rowspan="5"|
|-
| Love Me
| 
|-
| Poetic Justice (with Kendrick Lamar)
| 
|-
| Pop That (With French Montana)
| 
|-
| Started from the Bottom
| 
|-
| 2015
|"Trophies"
| 35 Most Performed R&B/Hip-Hop Songs
| 
| style="text-align:center;"|
|-
| 2016
|"Hotline Bling"
| 35 Most Performed R&B/Hip-Hop Songs
| 
| style="text-align:center;"|
|-
| rowspan="5"| 2017
|"Back to Back"
| rowspan="5"| 35 Most Performed R&B/Hip-Hop Songs
| 
| style="text-align:center;" rowspan="5"|
|-
| Jumpman (with Future)
| 
|-
| One Dance
| 
|-
| Pop Style
| 
|-
| Work (with Rihanna)
| 
|-
| rowspan="2"| 2018
|"Fake Love"
| rowspan="2"| 35 Most Performed R&B/Hip-Hop Songs
| 
| style="text-align:center;" rowspan="2"|
|-
| Passionfruit
| 
|}

BMI London Awards 

!
|-
| 2012
| "Marvin's Room"
| London Pop Award Songs
| 
| style="text-align:center;|
|-
| rowspan="2" | 2017
| "One Dance"
| rowspan="2"| London Pop Award Songs
| 
| style="text-align:center;"rowspan="2"|
|-
| "Summer Sixteen"
| 
|-
| rowspan="2" | 2018
| "Passionfruit"
| rowspan="2" | London Pop Award Songs
| 
| style="text-align:center;"rowspan="2"|
|-
| "Portland"
|

Brit Awards
The Brit Awards are the British Phonographic Industry's annual pop music awards, and the British equivalent to the American Grammy Award. Drake received two awards out of six nominations.

|-
|2016
|rowspan="2"|Drake
|rowspan="2"|International Male Solo Artist
| 
|-
|rowspan="2"|2017
|
|-
|Drake and Future
|International Group
| 
|-
|2018
|rowspan="2"|Himself
|rowspan="2"|International Male Solo Artist
| 
|-
|2019
| 
|-
|2021
|Best International Song
|"Girls Want Girls" 
|
|}

Clio Awards
The Clio Awards is an annual award program that recognizes innovation and creativity in advertising, design and communication.

!
|-
|2018
| God's Plan
| Bronze Winner for Best Music Video
| 
| style="text-align:center;"|
|}

Danish Music Awards

|-
|rowspan="1"|2014
|rowspan="1"|"Nothing Was The Same"
|rowspan="3"|International Album of the Year
| 
|-
|rowspan="1"|2015
|rowspan="1"|"If You're Reading This It's Too Late"
| 
|-
|rowspan="1"|2016
|rowspan="1"|"Views"
| 
|-
|}

Fonogram Awards
Fonogram Awards is the national music awards of Hungary, held every year since 1992 and promoted by Mahasz.

!
|-
|2017
| "Views"
|Best Foreign Rap or Hip-Hop Album of the Year
| 
|style="text-align:center;"|
|}

GAFFA Awards

GAFFA Awards (Norway)
Delivered since 2012. The GAFFA Awards (Norwegian: GAFFA Prisen) are a Norwegian award that rewards popular music awarded by the magazine of the same name.

|-
|rowspan="3"|2018
|rowspan="1"|Himself
|International Solo Artist of the Year
| 
|-
|"Scorpion" 
|International Album of the Year
| 
|-
|"God's Plan" 
|International Song of the Year
| 
|}

GAFFA Awards (Sweden)
Delivered since 2010. The GAFFA Awards (Swedish: GAFFA Priset) are a Swedish award that rewards popular music awarded by the magazine of the same name.

|-
|rowspan="2"| 2018
| More Life
| Best Foreign Album
| 
|-
|rowspan="2"| Himself
|rowspan="2"| Best Foreign Solo Act
| 
|-
|rowspan="2"| 2019
| 
|-
| "In My Feelings" 
| Best Foreign Song
| 
|}

Global Awards

|-
|rowspan="2"|2018
|rowspan="4"|Himself
|Best Male 
| 
|-
|Best R&B/Hip-hop or Grime
| 
|-
|rowspan="3"|2019
|Best Male 
| 
|-
|Best R&B/Hip-hop or Grime
| 
|-
|"In My Feelings"
|Best Song
| 
|-
|}

Grammy Awards
The Grammy Awards are awarded annually by the National Academy of Recording Arts and Sciences. Drake has won five awards from fifty-one nominations. In 2022 Drake was nominated for 2 awards, but requested that he be removed from the nominations list.

|-
|rowspan="2"|2010
|rowspan="2"|"Best I Ever Had"
|Best Rap Song
| 
|-
|rowspan="2"|Best Rap Solo Performance
| 
|-
|rowspan="4"|2011
|"Over"
| 
|-
|"Fancy" 
|Best Rap Performance by a Duo or Group
| 
|-
|Thank Me Later
|Best Rap Album
| 
|-
|Himself
|Best New Artist
| 
|-
|rowspan="4"|2012
|"I'm on One" 
|rowspan="2"|Best Rap/Sung Collaboration
| 
|-
|"What's My Name?" 
| 
|-
|Loud 
|Album of the Year
| 
|-
|"Moment 4 Life" 
|rowspan="2"|Best Rap Performance
| 
|-
|rowspan="3"|2013
|"HYFR (Hell Ya Fucking Right)" 
| 
|-
|"The Motto" 
|Best Rap Song
| 
|-
|Take Care
|rowspan="2"|Best Rap Album
| 
|-
|rowspan="5"|2014
|Nothing Was the Same
| 
|-
|rowspan="2"|"Started from the Bottom"
|Best Rap Performance
| 
|-
|rowspan="2"|Best Rap Song
| 
|-
|"Fuckin' Problems" 
| 
|-
|good kid, m.A.A.d city 
|rowspan="2"|Album of the Year
| 
|-
|rowspan="4"|2015
|Beyoncé 
| 
|-
|rowspan="2"|"0 to 100 / The Catch Up"
| Best Rap Performance
| 
|-
|Best Rap Song
| 
|-
|"Tuesday" 
|rowspan="2"| Best Rap/Sung Collaboration
| 
|-
|rowspan="5"|2016
|"Only" 
| 
|-
|"Back to Back"
|rowspan="2"|Best Rap Performance
| 
|-
|"Truffle Butter" 
| 
|-
|"Energy"
|Best Rap Song
| 
|-
|If You're Reading This It's Too Late
|rowspan="2"|Best Rap Album
| 
|-
|rowspan="8"|2017
|rowspan="2"|Views
| 
|-
|Album of the Year
| 
|-
|rowspan="2"|"Hotline Bling"
|Best Rap/Sung Performance
| 
|-
|Best Rap Song
| 
|-
|rowspan="2"|"Work" 
|Record of the Year
| 
|-
|Best Pop Duo/Group Performance
| 
|-
|"Come and See Me" 
|Best R&B Song
| 
|-
|"Pop Style" 
|rowspan="3"|Best Rap Performance
| 
|-
|rowspan="7"|2019
|"Nice for What"
| 
|-
|rowspan="2"|"Sicko Mode" 
| 
|-
|rowspan="2"|Best Rap Song
| 
|-
|rowspan="3"|"God's Plan"
| 
|-
|Record of the Year
| 
|-
|Song of the Year
| 
|-
|Scorpion
|Album of the Year
| 
|-
|rowspan="2"|2020
|"No Guidance" 
|Best R&B Song
| 
|-
|"Gold Roses" 
|rowspan="2"|Best Rap Song
| 
|-
|rowspan="3"|2021
|rowspan="2"|"Laugh Now Cry Later" 
| 
|-
| Best Melodic Rap Performance
| 
|-
|"Life Is Good" 
|Best Music Video
| 
|-
|rowspan="4"|2023
|Renaissance 
|Album of the Year
| 
|-
|rowspan="2"|"Wait For U" 
| Best Melodic Rap Performance
| 
|-
|rowspan="2"| Best Rap Song
| 
|-
|"Churchill Downs" 
| 
|-

iHeartRadio Much Music Video Awards
The iHeartRadio Much Music Video Awards (formerly known as MuchMusic Video Awards) are annual awards presented by the Canadian music video channel MuchMusic to honor the year's best music videos. In 2010, Drake had seven nominations, the most of any artist, winning two of them.

|-
|rowspan="7"|2010
|rowspan="2"|"Successful" 
|Cinematographer of the Year
| 
|-
|MuchVIBE Hip-Hop Video of the Year
| 
|-
|"BedRock" 
|International Video of the Year – Group
| 
|-
|"Over"
|rowspan="2"|International Video of the Year by a Canadian
| 
|-
|rowspan="3"|"Forever" 
| 
|-
|UR Fave: Canadian Video
| 
|-
|UR Fave: New Artist
| 
|-
|rowspan="3"|2011
|-
||Himself
|UR Fave: Artist
|
|-
||"Find Your Love"
|International Video of the Year by a Canadian
|
|-
|rowspan="6"|2012
|-
||Himself
|UR: Fave Artist
|
|-
|rowspan="2"|"Headlines"
|Video Of The Year
|
|-
|UR Fave: Video
|
|-
||"Take Care" 
|International Video of the Year by a Canadian
|
|-
||"The Motto" 
|MuchVibe Best Rap Video
|
|-
|rowspan="5"|2013
|rowspan="4"|"Started from the Bottom"
|Video of the Year
|
|-
|Director of the Year
|
|-
|Hip-Hop Video of the Year
|
|-
|Your Fave Video
|
|-
||Himself
|Your Fave Artist/Group
|
|-
|rowspan="7"|2014
|rowspan="4"|"Worst Behavior"
|Video of the Year
|
|-
|Director of the Year
|
|-
|Hip-Hop Video of the Year
|
|-
|Your Fave Video
|
|-
|"Live For" 
|Video of the Year
|
|-
|"Hold On, We're Going Home" 
|International Video of the Year By a Canadian
|
|-
|Himself
|Your Fave Artist/Group
|
|-
|rowspan="3"|2015
|"DnF"  
|Hip-Hop Video of the Year
|
|-
|rowspan="2"|Himself
|Most Buzzworthy Canadian
|
|-
|Your Fave Artist/Group
|
|-
|rowspan="7"|2016
|rowspan="5"|"Hotline Bling"
|Video of the Year
|
|-
|Director of the Year
|
|-
|Hip-Hop Video of the Year
|
|-
|Your Fave Video
|
|-
|Most Buzzworthy Canadian
|
|-
|"My Love" 
|Best MuchFACT Video
|
|-
|Himself
|Your Fave Artist/Group
|
|-
|rowspan="3"|2017
|rowspan="2"|Himself
|Most Buzzworthy Canadian Artist
|
|-
|Fan Fave Artist or Group
|
|-
|"One Dance"
|iHeartRadio Canadian Single of the Year
|
|-
|rowspan="7"|2018
|rowspan="2"|Himself
|Artist of the Year
|
|-
|Best Hip Hop Artist or Group
|
|-
|rowspan="3"|"God's Plan"
|Video of the Year
|
|-
|Fan Fave Video
|
|-
|rowspan="2"|Best Director
|
|-
|rowspan="2"|"Nice for What"
|
|-
|Song of the Summer
|
|}

iHeartRadio Music Awards
The iHeartRadio Music Awards is an American music awards show debuted in 2014. Drake has won eleven awards from twenty-three nominations.

iHeartRadio Titanium Awards 
iHeartRadio Titanium Awards are awarded to an artist when their song reaches 1 Billion Spins across iHeartRadio Stations.

Juno Awards
The Juno Awards are presented annually to musicians to acknowledge artistic and technical achievements in all aspects of Canadian music. Drake has won six awards from twenty nominations.

|-
|rowspan="4"|2010
|Himself
|New Artist of the Year
|
|-
|"Best I Ever Had"
|Single of the Year
|
|-
|"Still Fly"
|rowspan="2"|Rap Recording of the Year
|
|-
|So Far Gone
|
|-
|rowspan="6"|2011
|rowspan="3"|Himself
|Artist of the Year
|
|-
|Juno Award for Fan Choice Award|Fan Choice Award
|
|-
|Songwriter of the Year
|
|-
|rowspan="2"|Thank Me Later
|Album of the Year
|
|-
|Rap Recording of the Year
|
|-
|"Find Your Love"
|Single of the Year
|
|-
|rowspan="4"|2012
|rowspan="2"|Himself
|Artist of the Year
|
|-
|Juno Award for Fan Choice Award|Fan Choice Award
|
|-
|rowspan="2"|Take Care
|Album of the Year
|
|-
|Rap Recording of the Year
|
|-
|rowspan="2"|2013
|Himself
|Fan Choice Award
|
|-
|"HYFR" 
|Video of the Year
|
|-
|rowspan="4"|2014
|rowspan="2"|Himself
|Artist of the Year
|
|-
|Fan Choice Award
|
|-
|rowspan="2"|Nothing Was the Same
|Album of the Year
|
|-
|Rap Recording of the Year
|
|-
|rowspan="2"|2015
|Himself
|Fan Choice Award
|
|-
|"Hold On, We're Going Home" 
|Single of the Year
|
|-
|rowspan="5"|2016
|rowspan="2"|Himself
|Artist of the Year
|
|-
|Fan Choice Award
|
|-
|rowspan="2"|If You're Reading This It's Too Late
|Album of the Year
|
|-
|Rap Recording of the Year
|
|-
|"Hotline Bling"
|Single of the Year
|
|-
|rowspan="5"|2017
|rowspan="2"|Himself
|Artist of the Year
|
|-
|Fan Choice Award
|
|-
|rowspan="2"|Views
|Album of the Year
|
|-
|Rap Recording of the Year
|
|-
|"One Dance"
|Single of the Year
|

Latin American Music Awards
The Latin American Music Awards (Latin AMAs) is an annual American music award to be presented by Telemundo.

|-
|rowspan="2"|2016
|Drake
|Favorite Crossover Artist
|
|-
|"One Dance"
|Favorite Crossover Song
|
|-
| rowspan="3"| 2019
| Himself
| Favorite Crossover Artist
| 
| style="text-align:center;" rowspan="3"|
|-
| rowspan="2"| "Mia" (with Bad Bunny)
| Song of the Year
| 
|-
| Favorite Song - Urban
| 
|-
|}

London International Awards
The London International Awards, or LIA (formerly known as London International Advertising Awards, LIAA), are a worldwide awards annually honoring "pioneers, and embodiments of excellence" in advertising, digital media, production, design, music & sound and branded entertainment.

|-
| 2016
| "Hotline Bling" 
| Music Video: Best Music Video
|
| style="text-align:center;|

LOS40 Music Awards
The LOS40 Music Awards, formerly known as Los Premios 40 Principales, are annual awards organized by Spanish music radio Los 40. Drake received three nominations

|-
|rowspan="3"|2016
|Drake
|International Breakthrough New Act of the Year
|
|-
|"One Dance"
|International Song of the Year
|
|-
|Views
|International Recording of the Year
|
|}

MOBO Awards
The Music of Black Origin (MOBO) Awards were established in 1996 by Kanya King. They are held annually in the United Kingdom to recognize artists of any race or nationality performing music of black origin. Drake has received five nominations.

|-
|rowspan=2|2009
|rowspan="2"|Himself
|Best Hip-Hop Act
|
|-
|rowspan="3"|Best International Act
|
|-
|2010
||Himself
|
|-
|2012
|Himself
|
|-
|2015
|If Youre Reading This Its Too Late
|International Album
|
|-
|2016
|Himself
|Best International Act
|

MTV

MTV Africa Music Awards
The MTV Africa Music Awards are an annual awards show from MTV Africa, established in 2013. Drake has received one award over two nominations.

|-
|2014
|rowspan="2"|Himself
|rowspan="2"|Best International Act
|
|-
|2016
|

MTV Video Music Awards
The MTV Video Music Awards were established in 1984 by MTV to celebrate the top music videos of the year. Drake has won three awards from 37 nominations.

|-
|2009
|"Best I Ever Had"
|Best New Artist
|
|-
|rowspan=2|2010
|"Find Your Love"
|Best Male Video
|
|-
|"Forever" 
|Best Hip-Hop Video
|
|-
|rowspan=5|2012
|rowspan=4|"Take Care" 
|Video of the Year
|
|-
|Best Male Video
|
|-
|Best Art Direction
|
|-
|Best Cinematography
|
|-
|"HYFR" 
|rowspan=2|Best Hip-Hop Video
|
|-
|rowspan=2|2013
|rowspan=2|"Started from the Bottom"
|
|-
|Best Direction
|
|-
||2014
||"Hold On, We're Going Home" 
|rowspan=2|Best Hip-Hop Video
|
|-
|rowspan=5|2016
|rowspan=4|"Hotline Bling"
|
|-
|Video of the Year
|
|-
|Best Male Video
|
|-
|Best Art Direction
|
|-
|"One Dance" 
|Song of Summer
|
|-
|rowspan=8|2018
|rowspan=5|"God's Plan"
|Video of the Year
|
|-
|Song of the Year
|
|-
|Best Video with a Social Message
|
|-
|Best Direction
|
|-
|rowspan=2|Best Hip Hop
|
|-
|"Walk It Talk It" 
|
|-
|Himself
|Artist of the Year
|
|-
|rowspan=2|"In My Feelings"
|Song of Summer
|
|-
|rowspan=3|2019
|Song of the Year
|
|-
|"Sicko Mode" 
|Best Hip Hop
|
|-
|"Mia" 
|Best Latin 
|
|-
|rowspan=5|2020
|rowspan=3|"Life Is Good" 
|Video of the Year
|
|-
|Best Collaboration
|
|-
|Best Hip Hop
|
|-
|"Toosie Slide"
|Best Music Video From Home
|
|-
|rowspan=3|"Popstar" 
|Song of Summer
|
|-
|rowspan=5|2021
|Video of the Year
|
|-
|Best Direction
|
|-
|rowspan=2|"Laugh Now Cry Later" 
|Best Collaboration
|
|-
|Best Hip Hop
|
|-
|"What's Next"
|Best Editing
|

MTV Europe Music Awards
The MTV Europe Music Awards are an annual awards show from MTV Europe established in 1994. Drake has received twenty-one nominations and two awards.

|-
|rowspan="2"|2012
|rowspan="11"|Himself
|Best Hip-Hop
|
|-
|Best North American Act
|
|-
|rowspan="2"|2013
|Best Hip-Hop Act
|
|-
|Best Canadian Act
|
|-
|rowspan="2"|2014
|Best Hip-Hop
|
|-
|Best Canadian Act
|
|-
|rowspan="2"|2015
|Best Hip-Hop
|
|-
|Best Canadian Act
|
|-
|rowspan="4"|2016
|Best Male
|
|-
|Best Hip-Hop
|
|-
|Best Canadian Act
|
|-
|"Work"
|Best Song
|
|-
|rowspan="2"|2017
|rowspan="2"|Himself
|Best Hip-Hop Act
|
|-
|Best Canadian Act
|
|-
|rowspan="4"|2018
|"God's Plan"
|Best Song
|
|-
|rowspan="3"|Himself
|Best Artist
|
|-
|Best Hip-Hop
|
|-
|Best Canadian Act
|
|-
|rowspan="2"|2020
|"Popstar" 
|Best Video 
|
|-
|rowspan="2"|Himself
|rowspan="2"|Best Hip-Hop Act
|
|-
|2021
|

MTV Video Music Awards Japan
The MTV Video Music Awards Japan is the Japan version of the American VMA. Drake has received one award from five nominations.

|-
|2012
|"Headlines"
|Best Hip-Hop Video
|
|-
|2013
|"Fuckin' Problems"
|Best Hip-Hop Video
|
|-
|rowspan="3"|2016
|rowspan="2"|"Hotline Bling"
|Best International Male Video
|
|-
|Best Hip-Hop Video
|
|-
|Views
|International Album of the Year
|

NAACP Image Awards
The NAACP Image Awards is an award ceremony from the National Association for the Advancement of Colored People. Drake has received two awards from ten nominations.

|-
|2012
|Drake and Mary J. Blige
|Outstanding Duo or Group
|
|-
|rowspan="2"|2020
|rowspan="2"|"No Guidance" 
|Outstanding Duo, Group or Collaboration
|
|-
|Outstanding Music Video
|
|-
|rowspan="3"|2021
|Himself
|Outstanding Male Artist
|
|-
|"Laugh Now Cry Later" (feat. Lil Durk)
|rowspan="2"|Outstanding Hip Hop/Rap Song
|
|-
|"Life Is Good" (with Future)
|
|-
|rowspan="4"|2022
|Certified Lover Boy
|Outstanding Album 
|
|-
|Himself
|Outstanding Male Artist 
|
|-
|rowspan="2"|"Way 2 Sexy" 
|Outstanding Duo, Group or Collaboration (Contemporary)
|
|-
|Outstanding Hip Hop/Rap Song 
|
|-

Nickelodeon Kids' Choice Awards
The Nickelodeon Kids' Choice Awards, also known as the KCAs or Kids Choice Awards, is an annual awards show that airs on the Nickelodeon cable channel, that honors the year's biggest television, movie, and music acts, as voted by Nickelodeon viewers. Drake has received ten nominations.

|-
|rowspan="2"|2016
|"Hotline Bling"
|Favorite Song of the Year
|
|-
|rowspan="3"|Himself
|rowspan="3"|Favorite Male Singer
|
|-
|2017
|
|-
|rowspan="3"|2019
|
|-
|"In My Feelings"
|Favorite Song of the Year
|
|-
|"Sicko Mode" (with Travis Scott)
|Favorite Collaboration
|
|-
|rowspan="2"|2021
|Himself
|Favorite Male Artist
|
|-
|"Toosie Slide"
|Favorite Song
|
|-
|rowspan="2"|2022
|Himself
|Favorite Male Artist 
|
|-
|Certified Lover Boy
|Favorite Album 
|
|-
|rowspan|2023
|Himself
|Favorite Male Artist
|
|-
|}

NRJ Music Awards
The NRJ Music Award is an award presented by the French radio station NRJ to honor the best in the French and worldwide music industry.

|-
|rowspan="3"|2018
|"In My Feelings"
| Video of the Year
|
|-
|"God's Plan"
|International Song of the Year
|
|-
|Himself
|International Male Artist of the Year
|
|-
|}

People's Choice Awards
The People's Choice Awards are an annual awards show from CBS to regonize the best of pop culture. Drake has received zero awards from twenty nominations.

|-
||2011
|rowspan="5"|Himself
|rowspan="5"|Favorite Hip Hop Artist
|
|-
||2013
|
|-
||2014
|
|-
||2015
|
|-
|rowspan="2"|2016
|
|-
|If You're Reading This It's Too Late
|rowspan="2"|Favorite Album
|
|-
|rowspan="5"|2017
|Views
|
|-
|"Work" 
|rowspan="2"|Favorite Song
|
|-
|"One Dance" 
|
|-
|rowspan="6"|Himself
|Favorite R&B Artist
|
|-
|rowspan="2"|Favorite Male Artist
|
|-
|rowspan="2"|2018
|
|-
|The Most Hype Worthy Canadian of 2018
|
|-
|2019
|Male Artist of 2019 
|
|-
|rowspan="3"|2020
|Male Artist of 2020 
|
|-
|rowspan="2"|Life Is Good 
|Music Video of 2020 
|
|-
|Collaboration Song of 2020 
|
|-
|rowspan="3"|2021
|Himself
|Male Artist of 2021 
|
|-
|Certified Lover Boy
|Album of 2021 
|
|-
|Way 2 Sexy 
|Collaboration Song of 2021 
|

Polaris Music Prize
The Polaris Music Prize is a music award annually given to the best full-length Canadian album based on artistic merit, regardless of genre, sales, or record label.

|-
|2012
|Take Care
|rowspan="5"| Polaris Music Prize
|
|-
|2014
|Nothing Was the Same
|
|-
|2015
|If You're Reading This It's Too Late
|
|-
|2016
|Views
|
|-
|2017
|More Life
|
|}

Primetime Emmy Awards
The Primetime Emmy Award is an American award bestowed by the Academy of Television Arts & Sciences (ATAS) in recognition of excellence in American primetime television programming.

|-
| 2022
| Euphoria
| Outstanding Drama Series
| 
|}

SOCAN Awards 
The SOCAN Awards are an annual Canadian music industry award ceremony, honoring achievement in songwriting, composition, and publishing by its members. Drake has been awarded 12 times, including for Songwriter of the Year in 2019.

|-
|rowspan="3"|2014
|Himself
|Global Inspiration Award
|
|-
|rowspan="2"|"Hold On, We're Going Home"
|International Song
|
|-
|Urban Music
|
|-
|rowspan="2" |2016
|rowspan="2" |"Hotline Bling"
|Pop/Rock Music
|
|-
|Urban Music
|
|-
|rowspan="3" |2017
|Himself
|International Achievement
|
|-
|"One Dance"
|rowspan="2" |Pop/Rock Music
|
|-
|"Too Good"
|
|-
|2018
|"Fake Love"
|Rap Music
|
|-
|2019
|Himself
|Songwriter of the Year
|
|-
|rowspan="3" |2020
|"Sicko Mode"
|rowspan="2" |Rap Music
|
|-
|"Money in the Grave"
|
|-
|"No Guidance"
|R&B Music
|
|-
|}

Soul Train Music Awards
The Soul Train Music Awards is an annual award show aired in national broadcast syndication that honors the best in African American music and entertainment established in 1987. Drake has won six awards from forty-one nominations.

|-
|rowspan="3"|2009
|Himself
|Best New Artist
|
|-
|"Best I Ever Had"
|Record of the Year
|
|-
|"Successful" 
|Best Collaboration
|
|-
|rowspan="4"|2010
|Thank Me Later
|Album of the Year
|
|-
|rowspan="2"|"Find Your Love"
|Record of the Year
|
|-
|Best Hip-Hop Song
|
|-
|"Unthinkable" 
|Record of the Year
|
|-
||2011
|"Moment 4 Life" 
|rowspan="3"|Best Hip-Hop Song
|
|-
||2012
|"No Lie" 
|
|-
|rowspan="4"|2013
|rowspan="2"|"Poetic Justice" 
|
|-
|Song of the Year
|
|-
|rowspan="2"|"Started from the Bottom"
|Best Hip-Hop Song
|
|-
|Video of the Year
|
|-
|rowspan="3"|2014
|rowspan="2"|"Hold On, We're Going Home"
|Best Hip-Hop Song
|
|-
|Song of the Year
|
|-
|Nothing Was the Same
|Album of the Year
|
|-
|rowspan="3"|2015
|"Truffle Butter" 
|rowspan="2"|Best Hip-Hop Song
|
|-
|rowspan="2"|"Blessings" 
|
|-
|Best Collaboration
|
|-
|rowspan="12"|2016
|Views
|Album/Mixtape of the Year
|
|-
|rowspan="2"|"Hotline Bling"
|Best Dance Performance
|
|-
|rowspan="2"|Video of the Year
|
|-
|rowspan="4"|"Work" 
|
|-
|Best Dance Performance
|
|-
|Best Collaboration
|
|-
|rowspan="2"|Song of the Year
|
|-
|rowspan="2"|"Controlla"
|
|-
|rowspan="3"|Rhythm & Bars Award
|
|-
|"One Dance" 
|
|-
|rowspan="2"|"For Free" 
|
|-
|Best Collaboration
|
|-
|2017
|"Come Closer" 
|Best Dance Performance
|
|-
|2018
|"In My Feelings"
|Rhythm & Bars Award
|
|-
|rowspan="7"|2019
|"Going Bad" 
|Rhythm & Bars Award
|
|-
|rowspan="5"|"No Guidance" 
|The Ashford And Simpson Songwriter's Award
|
|-
|Best Dance Performance
|
|-
|Best Collaboration Performance
|
|-
|Video of the Year
|
|-
|rowspan="2"|Song of the Year
|
|-
|"Girls Need Love" (Remix)  
|
|-
|rowspan="2"|2020
|"Popstar" 
|rowspan="2"|Rhythm & Bars Award
|
|-
|"Laugh Now Cry Later" 
|
|-
|rowspan="2"|2021
|rowspan="2"|"You're Mines Still" 
|Song of the Year
|
|-
|Best Collaboration
|

South African Hip Hop Awards
The annual South African Hip Hop Awards were established in 2012.

!
|-
|2021
|Himself
|Best International Act
|
|

Sucker Free Award
The Sucker Free Awards are an awards show hosted by MTV. Drake has received one award out of two nominations.

|-
|rowspan="2"|2011
|"Headlines"
|Club Banger: Song of the Year
|
|-
|Young Money
|Best Crew
|
|}

Teen Choice Awards
The Teen Choice Awards were established in 1999 to honor the year's biggest achievements in music, movies, sports and television, as voted for by young people aged between 13 and 19. Drake has been nominated for 13 awards, winning 2 with the Degrassi cast in 2005 and 2007, respectively.

|-
||2005
|Degrassi: The Next Generation
|Choice Summer Series
|
|-
||2007
|Degrassi: The Next Generation
|Choice Summer TV Show
|
|-
||2008
|Degrassi: The Next Generation
|Choice Summer TV Show
|
|-
|rowspan="6"|2010
|So Far Gone
|Album – Rap
|
|-
|"Find Your Love"
|Best Rap/Hip-Hop Track
|
|-
|rowspan=4|Himself
|Breakout Artist Male
|
|-
|Male Artist
|
|-
|Rap Artist
|
|-
|Summer Music Star – Male
|
|-
|rowspan="3"|2012
|Himself
|Choice Music Male Artist
|
|-
|rowspan="2"|"Take Care" 
|Choice Music Single by a Male Artist
|
|-
|Choice Music R&B/Hip-Hop Track
|
|-
|rowspan="2"|2013
|Himself
|Choice Music: Rap Artist
|
|-
|"Started from The Bottom"
|Choice Music: R&B/Hip-Hop Track
|
|-
|2015
|Himself
|rowspan="2"|Choice Music: R&B/Hip-Hop Artist
|
|-
|rowspan="4"|2016
|rowspan="3"|Himself
|
|-
|Choice Music Male Artist
|
|-
|Choice Summer Music Star: Male
|
|-
|"One Dance" 
|Choice Music: R&B/Hip-Hop Song
|
|-
|rowspan="5"|2018
|rowspan="2"|Himself
|Choice Male Artist
|
|-
|Choice R&B/Hip-Hop Artist
|
|-
|rowspan="2"|"God's Plan"
|Choice Song: Male Artist
|
|-
|Choice R&B/Hip-Hop Song
|
|-
|"Nice for What"
|Choice Summer Song
|
|-
|rowspan="4"|2019
|rowspan="2"|Himself
|Choice R&B/Hip-Hop Artist 
|
|-
|Choice Summer Male Artist 
|
|-
|"Going Bad"  
|Choice R&B/Hip-Hop Song 
|
|-
|"Mia" 
|Choice Latin Song 
|
|}

Young Artist Award
The Young Artist Awards is an annual award show aired in national broadcast syndication that honors the best in African American music and entertainment established in 1987. As Aubrey Graham, Drake has won one award from five nominations.

|-
|2002
|rowspan=5|Degrassi: The Next Generation
|rowspan=2|Best Ensemble in a TV Series (Comedy or Drama)
|
|-
|2003
|
|-
|rowspan=2|2005
|Best Performance in a TV Series (Comedy or Drama) – Supporting Young Actor
|
|-
|Outstanding Young Performers in a TV Series
|
|-
|2006
|Best Young Ensemble Performance in a TV Series (Comedy or Drama)
|

Songwriters Hall of Fame
The Hal David Starlight Award is an award given yearly to a songwriter by the Songwriters Hall of Fame. Drake was the recipient in 2011.

|-
|| 2011 || Himself || Hal David Starlight Award||

Other accolades
 Ranked #3 Hottest MC by MTV (2009)
 Ranked #4 Hottest MC by MTV (2010)
 Ranked #2 Hottest MC by MTV (2011)
 Ranked #2 Hottest MC by MTV (2012)
 GQ Man of The Year for "Breakout of the Year" (2010)
 Named #4 Man of The Year by MTV (2010)

Notes

References

Awards
Lists of awards received by Canadian musician
Lists of awards received by Canadian actor